Eucalyptus baueriana subsp. thalassina, commonly known as Werribee blue box, is a subspecies of Eucalyptus baueriana that is endemic to Victoria. It was first formally described by taxonomist Kevin Rule in Muelleria in 2011.

References

Flora of Victoria (Australia)
Trees of Australia
baueriana thalassina
Myrtales of Australia
Plants described in 2011
Plant subspecies